The 1868 Kentucky gubernatorial special election was held in August 1868. Incumbent Democrat John W. Stevenson, who assumed office after the death of governor John L. Helm on September 8, 1867, defeated Republican nominee H. Tarvin Baker with 81.64% of the vote.

General election

Candidates
John W. Stevenson, incumbent Democratic governor
H. Tarvin Baker, Republican

Results

References

1868 special
Kentucky
Gubernatorial